Khandaker Nurul Alam (1937 – 22 January 2016) was a Bangladeshi music composer and singer. He won Bangladesh National Film Award for Best Music Director for the films Chandranath (1984), Shuvoda (1986), and Padma Meghna Jamuna (1991). He was awarded Ekushey Padak in 2008 by the Government of Bangladesh for his contribution to Bangladeshi music.

Career
From the 1960s, Alam was active in the music industry. He was the singer and composer of the song “Chokh Je Moner Kotha Bole” from the film “Je Agune Puri”. He was the composer for films based on the literary works of Sarat Chandra Chattopadhyay - Devdas, Chandranath, Shuvoda, Biraj Bou and others.

Discography

References

1937 births
2016 deaths
Date of birth missing
Bangladeshi male musicians
Best Music Director National Film Award (Bangladesh) winners
Recipients of the Ekushey Padak